The Droid Turbo is a high end smartphone developed by Motorola Mobility.  It is part of the Verizon Droid line, and was announced on October 28, 2014 on the Verizon Droid Does website. The Droid Turbo maintains a similar design shape to its predecessor, the Droid Maxx, with new durable ballistic nylon or metallized glass fiber reinforced with Kevlar as the materials offered. The on-screen buttons for back, home, and multitask functions were kept off-screen as capacitive soft-keys below the display.

Specifications

Hardware
The Droid Turbo came with a Snapdragon 805 quad-core processor clocked at 2.7 GHz, an Adreno 420 GPU, natural language processor for the phone's contextual features, and was backed by a 3,900 mAh battery.  The Droid Turbo also has a 5.2-inch Quad HD display with a 565 pixels per inch pixel density at a 1440×2560 resolution.

Software
The Droid Turbo shipped with Android 4.4.4 KitKat. The Turbo also came with Motorola's Moto app, which includes features such as Moto Voice, Moto Display, Moto Actions, and Moto Assist.

The device's operating system's first upgrade was to Android Lollipop, Android 5. Its last official upgrade was to Android Marshmallow, Android 6.0.1 and Motorola has confirmed that they have officially dropped support for the device and that the Droid Turbo would not receive the Android Nougat update.

Storage
The Droid Turbo features 32 GB of internal flash memory with the Kevlar version and 32 or 64 GB of internal flash memory with Ballistic nylon version and does not provide expandable memory via a MicroSDXC card slot.

International version
An international (GSM) version was announced in early November 2014, to be branded as "Moto Maxx", initially available only in Brazil, Puerto Rico and Mexico and released in Chile by early 2015.  Motorola has released the smartphone in India by the name of the Moto Turbo earlier in 2015.

References

Smartphones
Motorola mobile phones
Android (operating system) devices
Mobile phones introduced in 2014
Discontinued smartphones